Kuh Zar may refer to:
 Kuh Zar, Khuzestan
 Kuh Zar, Semnan